This is a list of years in Turkish television.

Twenty-first century

Twentieth century

See also 
 List of years in Turkey
 Lists of Turkish films
 List of years in television

Television
Television in Turkey by year
Turkish television